Muhammad Mosque or Siniggala Mosque is the mosque built in the 11th century in Old City, Baku, Azerbaijan. The mosque is also known as Siniggala, after the name of its minaret – Siniggala (“damaged tower”). The mosque acquired its second name in 1723, when military squadron of Russian Army, consisting of 15 warships and led by Admiral Matyushkin, approached the city from seaside and demanded its surrender during the Russo-Persian War (1722-1723). Russian warships began to bomb the city after the refusal to surrender. One of the Russian shells hit the minaret of Muhammad Mosque and damaged it. A stormy wind then blew the Russian ships further out to sea. The population of the city interpreted the wind as a divine scourge sent to the occupants. From that time until the middle of the 19th century, the minaret of the mosque wasn't reconstructed.  It remained a symbol of the persistence and courage of the defendants of the tower.

It is the first building in Azerbaijan, which is related to Islam and dated for its architectural ligature.

Architecture
According to Arabic inscription which was saved in front of doorway of northern wall of the mosque, it was built by ustad-rais Muhammad the son of Abu Bakr in 471 of Hijra (1078/79). It means that the architect was not only a master-ustad, but also a rais-head of artificers’ corporation.

Minaret
Minaret adjoins new mosque, which was constructed on the basis of the older one's plan. Trunk of the minaret is strong and slightly thinning. It is constructed from carefully drafted stone. Coarse and flat stalactites of tabling retain sherefe – muezzin’s balcony enclosed by stone plates. A ribbed dome completes the trunk of minaret. Narrow winding stairs are winded within the trunk. Ligature with Koranic inscription was traced under the tabling with archaic kufi alphabet.

References

External links

World Heritage Sites in Azerbaijan
Religious buildings and structures completed in 1079
11th-century mosques
Mosques in Baku
Icherisheher